Cryptothecia punctosorediata is a species of corticolous (bark-dwelling) crustose lichen in the family Arthoniaceae. Found in northern Thailand, it was formally described as a new species in 2005 by Laurens Sparrius. It contains the secondary compound gyrophoric acid. The specific epithet punctosorediata refers to the punctiform (dot-like and minute) soralia. At the time of publication, C. punctosorediata was the only species of Cryptothecia known to have discrete soralia.

References

punctosorediata
Lichen species
Lichens described in 2005
Lichens of Asia